Ogilvy Berlouis (22 August 1950 – 3 April 2018) was the first Minister of Home Affairs of Seychelles, which he held from 1977 until 1979. He was also the Minister of Defence and Youth of Seychelles and the Chief of Defence Forces of Seychelles from 1979 until his forced resignation by President France-Albert René in 1986.

References 

1950 births
2018 deaths
20th-century politicians
Defense ministers of Seychelles
Interior ministers of Seychelles
Youth ministers of Seychelles